The ACC men's basketball tournament (popularly known as the ACC tournament) is the conference championship tournament in men's basketball for the Atlantic Coast Conference (ACC). It has been held every year since the ACC's first basketball season concluded in 1954 (with the 2020 tournament only being partially completed due to  the COVID-19 pandemic). The ACC tournament is a single-elimination tournament and seeding is based on regular season records. The winner, declared conference champion, receives the conference's automatic bid to the NCAA men's tournament.

Tournament champions
Since July 1, 1961, the ACC's bylaws have included the phrase "and the winner shall be the conference champion" in referring to the tournament, meaning that the conference tournament winner is the only champion of the ACC.

Venues

Notes
* Denotes the venue for a future ACC men's basketball tournament.

Tournament championships by school

Footnotes
The 1972–73 NC State Wolfpack team was forced to skip postseason play due to an NCAA recruiting infraction. Assistant coach Eddie Biedenbach had played in a pick-up (impromptu) basketball game with David Thompson on a recruiting visit to Raleigh, North Carolina. The Wolfpack finished the season undefeated at 27–0 but forfeited the opportunity to compete for the national championship.
The University of Maryland, College Park, left the Atlantic Coast Conference in 2014 and is now a member of the Big Ten Conference.
The University of South Carolina left the Atlantic Coast Conference in 1971, and it is now a member of the Southeastern Conference.
After the 2020 tournament was cancelled due to the COVID-19 pandemic, the ACC automatic bid was awarded to regular season winner Florida State. There was no ACC Tournament champion that year.

References

General

Specific

 
Recurring sporting events established in 1954